Hubert Abold (born 13 June 1958) is a retired German professional Grand Prix motorcycle road racer. He won the 80 cc European Championship in 1983. He was runner-up in the 80 cc World Championship, as teammate to Champion Stefan Dörflinger in 1984.

References

External links 
Wildeman-Zündapp

German motorcycle racers
125cc World Championship riders
1958 births
Living people
Place of birth missing (living people)
80cc World Championship riders